Mindy Jostyn (June 5, 1956  – March 10, 2005) was an American singer and multi-instrumentalist.

Jostyn was born in Long Island City and grew up in San Jose, California and Wellesley, Massachusetts. When she was eleven years old she founded her first band, The Tigers.

Her musical focal points were folk, rock and pop. She played violin, guitar and harp, among other instruments. Before embarking on her solo career she was much sought-after by international artists such as Joe Jackson, Billy Joel, The Hooters, Cyndi Lauper, Jon Bon Jovi and Shania Twain.

Jostyn was married to Jacob Brackman, an American journalist, author and lyricist. She died of cancer in March 2005 in Hudson, New York.

Solo discography 
 Five Miles from Hope (1995)
 Cedar Lane (1997)
 In His Eyes (1998)
 Blue Stories (2002) 
 Coming Home (2005)

"Sideman" activities 
Jostyn performed with artists on their tours:
 Carly Simon (1996–2005)
 Cyndi Lauper "Sisters of Avalon"-Tour in Japan (1996)
 Andreas Vollenweider World tour (1995)
 John Mellencamp "Dance Naked"-Tour (1994)
 The Hooters "Out of Body" World Tour (1992–1993)
 Joe Jackson "Laughter and Lust" World Tour (1991)
 Billy Joel "Storm Front" World Tour (1989–1990)
 The New York Rock and Soul Revue (1989–1992)

She provided musical accompaniment on popular artists' recordings:
 Pat Benatar
 Shania Twain
 Jon Bon Jovi
 Kate Taylor
 Arlen Roth
 Lexie Roth
 John Waite
 Chaka Khan

She can be heard throughout several albums:
 The New York Rock and Soul Revue: Live at the Beacon (1991)
 Joe Jackson – Laughter & Lust Live (VHS, 1992)
 Donald Fagen – Kamakiriad (1993) 
 The Hooters – Out of Body (1993)
 The Hooters – The Hooters Live (1994)
 John Waite – When You Were Mine (1997)
 Charlie McIntosh – Cold Rain (1994)
 Carly Simon – Film Noir (1997)
 Andreas Vollenweider – Kryptos Columbia (1997) 
 Andreas Vollenweider – Cosmopoly (2000)

References

External links
 Official Website

1956 births
2005 deaths
American multi-instrumentalists
American women pop singers
Palmetto Records artists
20th-century American women singers
Deaths from cancer in New York (state)
Billy Joel Band members
The Hooters members
20th-century American singers
The New York Rock and Soul Revue members